Final Resolution is a professional wrestling Impact Plus event held by Impact Wrestling in December. Initially introduced as a pay-per-view by TNA in 2005, the event originally took place in January until 2008, when TNA moved the event to December of that year, with two Final Resolutions took place that year. On January 11, 2013, TNA announced that only four PPVs would be produced that year, with Final Resolution among the titles dropped. It would be produced as a special episode of TNA's weekly television program Impact Wrestling in 2013 and was revived as a monthly special for Impact Plus in 2020.

Events

References

External links
 TNAWrestling.com - the official website of Total Nonstop Action Wrestling